Shazam! Fury of the Gods (Original Motion Picture Soundtrack) is the soundtrack to the film of the same name composed by Christophe Beck. It was released on March 10, 2023 by WaterTower Music.

Background
In June 2022, Sandberg revealed that Benjamin Wallfisch was unable to return as composer from the first film due to scheduling conflicts, with Christophe Beck replacing him for the sequel and already beginning work by then. A single titled "Shazam! Fury of the Gods (Main Title Theme)" was released as a digital single by WaterTower Music on February 23, 2023, and the soundtrack album was released on March 10.

Track listing

Additional music 
In addition to Beck's score, the other songs that are featured in the film, includes "Holding Out For A Hero" by Bonnie Tyler, "A-O-K" by Tai Verdes, "This Must Be The Place" by Sure Sure, "Sabotage" by Beastie Boys, "SUPERBLOOM" by MisterWives, "A Little Less Conversation" by Elvis Presley (JXL Edit Remix), with the latter playing during the end credits. Additionally  the track "Check Out These Guns" from the soundtrack of Shazam! (2019) by Benjamin Wallfisch and Wonder Woman's theme "Is She With You?" from Batman v Superman: Dawn of Justice (2016) by Hans Zimmer and Junkie XL are featured.

References

External links
 Official site

2023 soundtrack albums
2020s film soundtrack albums
DC Extended Universe soundtracks
Shazam! (film series)